Rizes is the easternmost village in the municipal unit of Tegea in Arcadia, Greece. Its population was 552 in 2011. Its primary economic activity is agriculture.  Rizes' crops include cherries, potatoes, and grape cultivation and wine production.  The village lies at the roots of the mountain named Saint Elias (Προφήτης Ηλίας) which includes four noteworthy churches.  At the summit is the small church of the Prophet Elias followed by in order of descending elevation the churches of Saint Nicholas, Saint Marina and Saint Spyridon.  The feast of Saint Marina is celebrated every year on 17 July with a popular festival in the village.

Notable individuals 
 Angelo Tsakopoulos (Born 1936), prominent Greek-American real estate developer

References

External links 
  Municipality of Tegea information page on population.

Populated places in Arcadia, Peloponnese